Union Springs is a city in and county seat of Bullock County, Alabama, United States. The population was 3,980 at the 2010 census.

History
The area that became Union Springs was first settled by white men after the Creek Indian removal of the 1830s. Twenty-seven springs watered the land, giving rise to the name of Union Springs. The city was incorporated on January 13, 1844. Voters selected Union Springs as the county seat when Bullock County was formed in 1866.

Geography
Union Springs is located in southeastern Alabama near the center of Bullock County at 32°8'24.407" North, 85°42'46.094" West (32.140113, -85.712804). The source of the Conecuh River is within the city limits.

The city is located at the intersection of U.S. Route 82 and U.S. Route 29. Route 82 leads east  to Eufaula and northwest  to Montgomery, the state capital. Route 29 leads north  to Tuskegee and southwest  to Troy.

Climate
The climate in this area is characterized by hot, humid summers and generally mild to cool winters.  According to the Köppen Climate Classification system, Union Springs has a humid subtropical climate, abbreviated "Cfa" on climate maps.

Demographics

2020 census

As of the 2020 United States census, there were 3,358 people, 1,353 households, and 856 families residing in the city.

2010 census
The racial makeup of the city was 71.8% Black or African American, 12.9% White,  0.2% Native American, 0.4% Asian, 1.1% Pacific Islander, 12.8% from other races, and .8% from two or more races. Hispanic or Latino of any race were 17.0% of the population.

There were 1,461 households, out of which 32.1% had children under the age of 18 living with them, 24.4% were married couples living together, 32.5% had a female householder with no husband present, and 37.4% were non-families. 33.1% of all households were made up of individuals, and 11.5% had someone living alone who was 65 years of age or older. The average household size was 2.59 and the average family size was 3.27.

In the city, the age distribution of the population shows 29.5% under the age of 18, 10.5% from 18 to 24, 23.6% from 25 to 44, 22.6% from 45 to 64, and 13.7% who were 65 years of age or older. The median age was 30.5 years. For every 100 females, there were 85.9 males. For every 100 females age 18 and over, there were 84.7 males.

The median income for a household in the city was $22,476, and the median income for a family was $26,167. Males had a median income of $37,689 versus $21,372 for females. The per capita income for the city was $20,485. About 39.0% of families and 44.4% of the population were below the poverty line, including 73.9% of those under age 18 and 19.4% of those age 65 or over.

Education
Union Springs is served by the Bullock County School District. There are two highs schools in the city: Bullock County High School and Bullock County Career Technical Center. There is one middle school, South Highlands Middle School, and one elementary school, Union Springs Elementary.

Conecuh Springs Christian School is a private school for grades K through 12.

Media

Newspaper
 Union Springs Herald

Radio
 WQSI 93.9 FM (Modern Rock)

Infrastructure
The United States Postal Service operates the Union Springs Post Office. The Alabama Department of Corrections operates the Bullock Correctional Facility in an Unincorporated community in Bullock County, east of Union Springs.

Economy
A cotton growing region, the arrival of the railroad spurred new economic growth after the Civil War. By the early 1900s, many of the old cotton plantations had become hunting preserves, attracting tourists. The city remains the economic hub of the surrounding agricultural counties.

A major employer in the city is Bonnie Plants, Inc., a plant wholesaler founded in 1918 with revenue exceeding over $250 million by 2020.

Recreation and culture
Union Springs hosts annual field trials for hunting dogs. These trials take place between October and March and attract participants from around the country.

Notable people
Henry Babers, Christian evangelist, Bible teacher, and scholar
Winton M. Blount, United States Postmaster General (1969–1972)
John Warren Branscomb, bishop of the United Methodist Church
Edith Burroughs, first African American to win a professional bowling tournament in the United States
Helen Claire, Broadway actress
John Henrik Clarke, Pan-Africanist
Fate Echols, NFL player
Lucy Feagin, first woman to operate a drama school in New York City
Seal Harris, former heavyweight boxer
Jimmy Hitchcock, first All-American football player at Auburn University
Eddie Kendricks, co-founder of The Temptations
Thom S. Rainer, President and CEO, LifeWay Christian Resources
Tim Stowers, college football coach
Mary Hardway Walker, one of the last surviving enslaved people

Gallery

References

External links

 Union Springs tourism website
 Bullock County School District

Cities in Alabama
Cities in Bullock County, Alabama
County seats in Alabama
Populated places established in 1835